Cycloprosopus is a monotypic moth genus of the family Erebidae erected by Max Gaede in 1939. Its only species, Cycloprosopus strigifera, was first described by Arnold Pagenstecher in 1907. It is known from Madagascar.

References

 Gaede, M. (1939). In Seitz, A. Die Gross-Schmetterlinge der Erde. 15: 280.

Calpinae
Taxa named by Max Gaede
Monotypic moth genera